American Kid is the seventh studio album by American singer-songwriter Patty Griffin, released by New West Records on May 7, 2013. It was recorded in Memphis, Tennessee. Griffin recorded the album as a tribute to her late father.

Critical reception

The album was universally acclaimed by music critics. On Metacritic, it has a weighted average score of 85/100 based on reviews from 15 critics, and on AnyDecentMusic?, it has a weighted average rating of 8.5/10 based on reviews from 12 critics.

Jim Beviglia of American Songwriter proclaimed the album to be "a tour de force of nimble songwriting and emotional performances", and Hal Horowitz, also of American Songwriter, said the album contains "shimmering music you won't soon forget." Martin Chilton of The Daily Telegraph wrote that "American Kid is a triumph of songwriting and expressive singing." Jordan Mainzer of musicOMH called the album "one of the best albums of the year so far", Neil Spencer of The Observer called it "a triumph", and Nick Coleman of The Independent called it "a compelling experience." 

Thom Jurek concluded his review for Allmusic by stating that, "With its immediacy, economy, cagey strength, and vulnerability, Griffin delivers these 12 songs not as gifts or statements, but as her own evidence of what is, what was, and what yet may come." Steve Pick of Blurt called the album "perhaps" Griffin's "finest hour." Jason Schneider of Exclaim! said the album "puts the full range of [Griffin's] talent on display." Holly Gleason of Paste wrote that, on the album, Griffin was expressing "emotional truths" and "cutting to the quick," and that her "razor-sharp sense of detail has never been sharper". Will Hermes of Rolling Stone noted that "it's clear [Griffin's] writing remains as surprising as it is masterful." Rob Hughes of Uncut called the album "a bewitching piece of work, with or without the hired help", due to Griffin's "elegant phrasing and nuanced delivery", and said it "manages to sound deeply affectionate without being sentimental."

Track listing

Personnel
Patty Griffin – vocals (all songs), guitar (1-8, 10-12), piano (9)
Cody Dickinson – drums (1, 2, 3, 4, 10), percussion (1, 3, 4, 6), jug (10)
Luther Dickinson – guitar (3, 4, 5, 6, 10), slide guitar (1), banjo (2)
Doug Lancio – mandolin (1, 4, 5, 10), guitar (2, 3, 5, 6), baritone guitar (11)
Craig Ross – guitar (1, 3, 7, 8), baritone guitar (2, 3, 4, 7), bass (2, 10), organ (6, 7), piano (11), backing vocals (6), percussion (3), Omnichord (12)
Robert Plant – duet vocals (3, 7), backing vocals (6)
Byron House – bowed bass (7, 8)
John Deaderick – organ (10, 12), piano (10)
Luther, Cody, Doug, Roy, Patty – drunken choir (10)
Mike Poole – mixing (all songs)

Chart performance

References

2013 albums
Patty Griffin albums